KSTJ may refer to:

 KSTJ (FM), a radio station (91.3 FM) licensed to serve Hartford, South Dakota, United States
 KSTJ-LP, a defunct low-power radio station (104.3 FM) licensed to serve Sioux Falls, South Dakota
 KFRH, a radio station (104.3 FM) licensed to serve Las Vegas, Nevada, United States, which used the call sign KSTJ from September 1998 to October 2007
 The ICAO airport code for Rosecrans Memorial Airport in St. Joseph, Missouri, United States
 A Knight of the Venerable Order of Saint John